Turkish Handball Super League is the highest league in the Turkish handball and comprises the top 12 elite men teams. The league began in 1982–83.

Structure
The season starts in the end of September with a regular season with 12 teams meeting each other twice. The four best teams after the regular season qualify for the play-off. After 1–4 and 2–3 clashes, the winners go to the league final.

Turkish Handball Super League past champions

 1979 : MTA SK Ankara
 1980 : MTA SK Ankara (2)
 1981 : Beşiktaş
 1982 : Beşiktaş (2)
 1983 : İstanbul Bankası Yenişehir
 1984 : İstanbul Bankası Yenişehir (2)
 1985 : Hortaş Yenişehir (3)
 1986 : Tarsus Erkutspor
 1987 : Halkbank
 1988 : Halkbank (2)
 1989 : Arçelik SK Istanbul
 1990 : Polisgücü Eskisehir
 1991 : Polisgücü Eskisehir (2)
 1992 : Halkbank (3)
 1993 : Polisgücü Eskisehir (3)
 1994 : Halkbank (4)
 1995 : Çankaya Belediye SK
 1996 : Çankaya Belediye SK (2)
 1997 : Çankaya Belediye SK (3)
 1998 : ASKİ SK
 1999 : Çankaya Belediye SK (4)
 2000 : ASKİ SK (2)
 2001 : ASKİ SK (3)
 2002 : ASKİ SK (4)
 2003 : ASKİ SK (5)
 2004 : ASKİ SK (6) 
 2005 : Beşiktaş (3)
 2006 : Spor Toto SK
 2007 : Beşiktaş (4)
 2008 : İzmir BŞB 
 2009 : Beşiktaş (5)
 2010 : Beşiktaş (6)
 2011 : Beşiktaş (7)
 2012 : Beşiktaş (8)
 2013 : Beşiktaş (9) 
 2014 : Beşiktaş (10)
 2015 : Beşiktaş (11)
 2016 : Beşiktaş (12)
 2017 : Beşiktaş (13)
 2018 : Beşiktaş (14)
 2019 : Beşiktaş (15)
 2020 : Cancelled due to COVID-19 pandemic
 2021 : Spor Toto SK (2)
 2022 : Beşiktaş (16)

See also
 Turkish Women's Handball Super League

External links
 Turkish Handball Association (THF)

League
Turkey
1982 establishments in Turkey
Professional sports leagues in Turkey